The New Journal and Guide is a regional weekly newspaper based in Norfolk, Virginia, and serving the Hampton Roads area. The weekly focuses on local and national African-American news, sports, and issues and has been in circulation since 1900.

History
Begun in Norfolk in 1900 by the Supreme Lodge Knights of Gideon, a Black fraternal order, it was originally called the Gideon Safe Guide. The name later was changed to the Lodge Norfolk and Guide, and from 1910 to 1991, it was called both the Norfolk Journal and Guide and the Journal and Guide. Since 1991, it has been called the New Journal and Guide.

By the time World War II was under way, the Journal and Guide was the largest Black employer in the South. Circulation soared to over 100,000 and the paper was the only one south of the Mason–Dixon line to carry a national edition. It won four consecutive Wendell Willkie awards for outstanding journalism. Along with the Chicago Defender, the Baltimore Afro-American and the Pittsburgh Courier, the Journal and Guide took the lead in informing the Black community on events as they related to such issues as housing and job discrimination among Black soldiers. At that time, the Guide ranked fourth in circulation among Black newspapers in the United States.

Many persons have made contributions to the continuing publication of the Journal and Guide tradition, notably P. B. Young, Sr. (the founding publisher who served more than 50 years and for whom a Norfolk public housing community is named), Thomas Young, P. B. Young, Jr., Bernard Young, Southall Bass, John Q. Jordan, John Hinton, Dr. Gordon B. Hancock, Dr. Milton A. Reid, James N. Rhea, and Dr. Carlton B. Goodlett.

The New Journal and Guide publishes each Thursday and has a readership that extends throughout the United States and abroad. 

The current publisher and owner is Brenda H. Andrews, who is also the company president.

External links

Library of Congress: currently 
Also several entries under the LoC's Chronicling America project: search under 'N'

Newspapers published in Virginia
African-American newspapers
Newspapers established in 1900
Mass media in Norfolk, Virginia
1900 establishments in Virginia